Yatapana is a village in Sri Lanka. It is located within Sabaragamuwa Province, Sri Lanka.

See also
List of settlements in Sabaragamuwa Province
Yatapana, a village located in Sabaragamuwa Province near Kotiyakumbura.

External links

Populated places in Sabaragamuwa Province